Yrjö Hakoila (19 January 1932 – 10 December 1986) was a Finnish rower. He competed in the men's eight event at the 1952 Summer Olympics.

References

1932 births
1986 deaths
Finnish male rowers
Olympic rowers of Finland
Rowers at the 1952 Summer Olympics
Sportspeople from Turku